Weng Kangqiang (born 4 May 1959) is a Chinese former decathlete who competed in the 1984 Summer Olympics.

References

1959 births
Living people
Chinese decathletes
Olympic athletes of China
Athletes (track and field) at the 1984 Summer Olympics
Asian Games medalists in athletics (track and field)
Athletes (track and field) at the 1982 Asian Games
Asian Games gold medalists for China
Medalists at the 1982 Asian Games